Oblak is a surname. Notable people with the surname include:

Branko Oblak (born 1947), Slovenian footballer and manager
Jan Oblak (born 1993), Slovenian footballer
Marijan Oblak (1919–2008), Croatian Roman Catholic archbishop
Matjaž Oblak, Slovenian football goalkeeper who played in the Tretja SNL and father of Jan
Robert Oblak (born 1968), Slovenian footballer
Stojanka Oblak, Slovenian handballer and mother of Jan
Teja Oblak (born 1990), Slovenian basketball player and older sister of Jan

See also
 

Slovene-language surnames